Fritz Schumacher (November 4, 1869 – November 5, 1947) was a German architect and urban designer.

List of works 
 Damenkabine im Dampfer Elbe“  1892
 Renovierung u. Innenausstattung von Schloß Prösel 1893
 Bayerisches Nationalmuseum München 1893
 Umbau eines Hauses am Gardasee  1893
 Künstlerhaus München  1893
 Umbau eines Palazzo  1894
 Gartenplastikentwürfe für Schloß Kronberg 1894
 Hotelbau  1894–95
 Entwurf einer Kirche 1894
 Wettbewerb Teichmann-Brunnen 1895
 Konzertsaal im Städtischen Kaufhaus 1895
 Grabumlegungen im Neubau der Johanniskirche 1895
 Villa Heinrich Siller  1896–97
 Rathaus Leipzig 1897–99
 Vorschlag zur Erhaltung der Matthäikirche Leipzig 1897
 Medaille 1897
 Entwurf für ein Bismarckdenkmal1897
 Villa Toelle  1897–98
 Villa Erbslöh  1897–98
 Wettbewerb Hochbahnhaltestelle Berlin 1898
 Grabmalentwürfe  1898
 Entwürfe für zwei Standuhren  1898
 „Architektur-Studien“  1898
 Studien zu einem Krematorium  1899
 Studie zu  einem Justizpalast   um 1899
 Bühnenbild zu Fritz Schumacher, 
 Phantasien in Auerbachs Keller“  1899
 Plakat zu Phantasien in Auerbachs Keller“  1899
 Plakat für Champagne-Reitverein, Maskenfest  1900
 Bühnenbild zu Johann Wolfgang von Goethe, 
 Palaeophron und Neoterpe“  1900–01
 Entwürfe für Exlibris 1900–01
 Buchausstattungen  1900–01
 Teppichentwürfe 1900–02
 Villa von Halle  1900
 Villa Klug 1900
 Landhaus Iken 1900
 Erweiterung eines Schlosses 1901
 Innenraumausstattung der eigenen Wohnung 1901
 Villa in Konstanz  1901–02
 Villen für Mitglieder de r Familie Weddigen  1902
 Skizze zu einem Brunnendenkmal 1902
 Entwurf zu einem Ludwig-Richter-Denkmal um 1902
 Grabmal um 1902
 Grabmal Langewiesche um 1902
 Grabmal Meissner  um 1902
 Entwurf einer freireligiösen Kirche 1903
 Wettbewerb Rathaus Dresden  1903
 Villa Grübler  1903
 Umgestaltung des Hauptsaales der Städte-Ausstellung 1903
 Grabmal Scharff  um 1903
 Entwurf eines Krematoriums 1903
 Entwurf zu einem Brunnen 1903
 Entwurf zu einem Goethe-Monumentalbrunnen 1903
 Vorschlag zur Aufstellung eines Bismarck-Denkmals 1903
 Umgestaltung des Hauptsaales der Kunstaussellung 1904
 Wahlurne 1904
 Umgestaltung des Theaterplatzes 1905
 Entwurf eines Damenzimmers  1905
 Innenausstattung der Villa Hirzel  1905
 Haus Bauer 1905
 Umbau des Landsitzes von Heyl 1905
 Zwei Denkmäler 1901–05
 Franzius-Denkmal  1905
 Grabmalentwürfe (ebenso Werke 65, 67, 77, 93)  1903–07
 Standuhr für das Leipziger Rathaus 1906
 Dritte Deutsche Kunstgewerbe-Ausstellung 1906
 Protestantischer Kirchenraum  1906
 Wohnzimmer im Sächsischen Haus1906
 Kindergrabmäler (W 65.3) 1906
 Grabmal 1906
 Ladenpavillon 1906
 Grabmal Louise Gushurst um 1906
 Grabmalentwurf 1906
 Kriegsgedächnismal 1906
 Grabmal Kuoni-Stoppany 1906
 Wettbewerb Stadthaus Bremen 1906
 Grabmal Klinkhardt  1906–07
 Grabmal Mohr  1906–07
 Grabmal Floh  1906–07
 Grabmal Fusbahn  1906–07
 Villa Sombart  1906–08
 Bebauungsplan Kronprinzenstraße 1907
 Grabmalentwurf 1907
 Grabmal Freidrich Assmann  Um 1907
 Grabmal Weichardt   um 1907
 Hochkreuz auf dem Friedhof Uerdingen  um 1907
 Bühnenbild zu Shakespeares Hamlet“  1907–09
 Villa Osthaus   1908
 Wettbewerb für eine Kirche  1908
 Wettbewerb für eine Kirche  1908
 Entwurf des Ausstellungsraumes der Zunft“ 1908
 Empfangszimmer 1908
 Gutachten für den Dürerbund 1908
 Speisesaal für die Hessische Landesausstellung  1908
 Handelshochschule Leipzig  1908
 Grabmal Friedrich Otto Schneider 1906–08
 Grabmal Wilhelm Grube um 1908
 Grabmal Franz Zimmermann  um 1908
 Grabmal  um1908
 Grabmal Helene Thierfelder  um 1908
 Grabmal Bernhard Floss um 1908
 Grabmal Hüttel 1908
 Umbau Villa Schumacher 1908–09
 Krematorium Tolkewitz  1908–11
 Innengestaltung Villa Metrowsky 1909
 Grabmal Kluepfel 1906–09 
 Grabmal Lauenpusch 1909
 Wettbewerb Heilandskirche 1909
 Bühnenbildentwürfe 1909
 Gasometer Fuhlsbüttel  1909
 Grabmal Böcking  1909
 Grabmal Marie Kunze  um 1909
 Grabmal um1909
 Grabmal Ernst von Halle um 1909
 Grabmal Kenzler um 1909
 Grabmal Marcus um 1911
 Innenumgestaltung des St.-Petri Domes  1909–10
 Bebauungsplanung Groß-Borstel  1910–11
 Pfarrhaus und Kirchplatz St. Michaelis  1910–12
 Realgymnasium Hammer Steindamm  1910–13
 Technische Staatslehranstalten  1910–14
 Hilfsschule Birkenau  1911
 Entwurf eines Zollverwaltungsgebäudes  1914
 Entwurf zu einem Brückenpfeiler  um 1911
 Polizeiwache Hammer Deich  1911–12
 Volksschule Lutterothstraße  1911–12
 Volksschule Rübenkamp  1911–12
 Volksschule Teutonenweg 1911–12
 Oberschulbehörde  1911–12
 Lehrerinnenseminar  1911–12
 Staatliche Kunstgewerbeschule Hamburg  1911–13
 Institut für Geburtshilfe  1911–14
 Hauptfeuerwache Berliner Tor  1911–15
 Erweiterung des Strafjustizgebäudes  1911–15
 Stadtpark Hamburg  1911–30
 Bebauungsplanung Kleinwohnungssiedlung Finkenwerder  1912
 Bebauungsplanung Farmsen-Berne 1912
 Entwurf für ein Kunstvereinsgebäude an der Außenalster 1912
 Bebauungsplanung Kleinhaussiedlung Farmsen-Berne  1912
 Neugestaltung des Platzes hinter der Kunsthalle  1912
 Grabmalentwürfe 1912
 Grabmal Rosen 1912
 Seglerheim mit Arbeiterspeisehalle um 1914
 Studien zur Reform des Kleinwohnungsbaus um 1912
 Irrenanstalt Friedrichsberg 1912–14
 Schwesternhaus Eppendorfer Krankenhaus 1912–14
 Tropeninstitut Hamburg 1912–14
 Gelehrtenschule Johanneum 1912–14
 Volksschule am Tieloh  1911–13
 Gewerbehaus Hamburg  1912–15
 Hauptrestaurant im Stadtpark  1912–16
 Pathologie Eppendorfer Krankenhaus   1912–16/ 26
 Feuerwache Petroleumhafen  1913
 Entwurf Grundbuchamt Alstertor  1913
 Hindenburgstraßenbrücke 1925
 Polizeiwache am Spielbudenplatz  1913–14
 Hansaschule Bergedorf 1913–14
 Volkslesehalle und Mönckebergbrunnen  1913–14
 Verwaltungsgebäude Dammtorwall 1913–15
 Grabmal Burchard  1913–15
 Alsterkanalisierung  1913–16
 Museum für Hamburgische Geschichte  1913–22
 Museum für Hamburgische Geschichte (Einbau historischer Bauteile)  1913–22
 Museum für Hamburgische Geschichte (Nicht ausgeführter Entwürfe)  1913–22
 Stadthauserweiterung  1914
 Polizeiwache Hoheluft  1914
 Sportzentrum am Wasserturm  1914
 Alsterdammbrücke  1914
 Bebauungsplanung Alsterdorf-Fuhlsbüttel  1914
 Umbau Wohnhaus Fritz Schumacher  1914
 Grabmal Lichtwark  1914
 Finanzdeputation Hamburg  1914 (1926)
 Stiftungsschule am Zeughausmarkt 1914–15
 Realschule Uferstraße  1914–15
 Leichenhalle Barmbek  1914–15
 Erweiterungsplanung Friedhof Ohlsdorf  1914–15
 Landhaus im Hamburger Stadtpark 1914–15
 |col2=
 Trinkhalle mit Sondergarten  1914–15
 Kaskade am Stadtparksee  1914–15
 Stadtparkcafé  1914–16
 Zwei Brücken am Stadtpark-Kanalhafen  1914–16
 Kleinkinderhaus Winterhude  1914–16
 Planschbecken mit Schutzhalle  1914–23
 Entwurf der Volksschule Großmannstraße  1915
 Bebauungsplanung Cuxhaven  1915
 Erweiterung des Hüttengefängnisses  1914
 Studie zu einem Kriegsgedächtnismal  um 1915
 Volksschule Burgstraße  1915 (1921)
 Freibad Lattenkamp  1915 (1926)
 Studie zu einem Ehrenhof am Wasserturm  1916
 Studie Eckbebauung Ankelmannstraße  1916
 Schule Klein-Grasbrook  1916
 Kriegsgedächnismal 1916
 Seekriegsgedächtnismale 1916
 Spiel- und Kampfanlage als Kriegsgedächtnisstätte 1916
 Kriegsgedächnisdmal  1916
 Bedürfnisanstalt Paulinenplatz  1917
 Erweiterungsbau der Hamburger Kunsthalle 1917–19
 Bebauungsplanung Horn 1917–26
 Bebauungsplan Kleingartenkolonie Groß-Borstel 1918
 Bebauungsplanung Volksdorf-Wensenbalken 1918
 Grabmal Troplowitz-Mankiewcz 1918
 Bebauungsplan Kleinwohnungssiedlung Dulsberg 1918–19
 Grabmal Mollweide 1919
 Bedürfnisanstalt Stellinger Weg 1919
 Bedürfnisanstalt Alsterdorfer Damm 1919
 Wettbewerb zur Bebaung des Inneren Rayon Köln 1919
 Bühnenbildentwürfe für eine Monumentalbühne -  Goethes Iphigenie auf Tauris um 1919
 Lichtwarkschule 1919 (1925)
 Volksschule Ahrensburger Straße 1919–20
 Lyzeum am Lübeckertorfeld  1919–20
 Kaufmännische Fortbildungsschule 1919–20
 Kleinhaussiedlung Langenhorn  1919–21
 Entwurf eines Pfarrhaus für St. Georg  1920
 Luft- und Sonnenbad im Hamburger Stadtpark  1920
 Grabanlage für die Opfer der Revolutionsjahre 1918–20  1920
 Denkmal für Wilhelm Cordes  1920
 Bühnenbild zu Shakespeares Macbeth“  1920
 Studie zur Platzgestaltung am Dammtor  um 1920
 Staatswohnungsbauten Dulsberg 1921–23
 Generalsiedlungsplan Köln 1920–23
 Volksschule Ratsmühlendamm  1919
 Wettbewerb Brückenkopf Deutzer Brücke 1922
 Bücherhalle am Museum für Kunst und Gewerbe 1923
 Ehrengrabstätte der Polizei  1923
 Entwurf einer Universitätsbibliothek 1924
 Bedürfnisanstalt am Goldbekplatz 1925
 Bebauungsplan Kleinwohnungssiedlung Veddel  1925
 Anlage des Heinrich-Heine-Denkmals 1925–26
 Heilwigbrücke 1925–26
 Bebauungsplan Hamm-Nord  1925–26
 Polizeiwache Oberalster  1925 –26
 Staatskrankenhaus Cuxhaven  1925–27
 Bedürfnisanstalt im Wehber`schen Park 1926
 Berufsschule Angerstraße  1926–27
 Hilfsschule Bundesstraße  1926–27
 Amtsgericht Bergedorf  1926–27
 Brücke Von-Essen-Straße  1926–27
 Flughallen A und B  1926–27
 Bebauungsplan Jarrestadt 1926–28
 Gefängnis Glasmoor  1926–28
 Projekt Naturhistorisches Museum  1910 u. 1926/ 28
 Bebauungsplanung des Lübeckertorfeldes 1926–29
 Gutachten zum Generalssiedlungsplan Bremen 1926–30
 Bedürfnisanstalt Klein-Borstel  1927
 Polizeiwache Geffkenstraße 1927
 Polizeihaus Springeltwiete 1927
 Eppendorfer Brücke  1927
 Kraftwagenhalle für die Stadtreinigung 1927
 Seeflughalle Travemünde 1927–28
 Friedhofskapelle XIII  1927–28
 Feuerwache Veddel 1927–28
 Krugkoppelbrücke 1927–28
 Fernsichtbrücke 1927–28
 Erweiterung des Untersuchungsgefängnisses 1927–28
 Volksschule Langenfort  1927–29
 Erweiterungsbauten für die Straßenreinigung 1927–29
 Gorch-Fockhalle 1927–29
 Erweiterungsbau Ziviljustizgebäude (Grundbuchhalle)1927–30
 Bellevuebrücke  1928–29
 Bedürfnisanstalt Hoheluft 1928
 Bedürfnisanstalt Steintorplatz  1928
 Bedürfnisanstalt am Klosterstern 1928
 Realschule Alstertal  1928
 Gewerbeschule Uferstraße 1928
 Tierkörper-Verwertungsanstalt  um 1928
 Projekt zur Verlegung der Universität Hamburg  1928
 Entwurf für den Umbau der Großen Markthalle  1928
 Polizeiwache Alsterdorfer Straße  1928
 Höhere Realschule und Volksschule Volksdorf 1928–29
 Volksschule Adlerstraße  1928–29
 Volksschule Marienthaler Straße 1928–29
 Volksschule Wiesendamm 1928–29
 Volksschule Wendenstraße 1928–29
 Volksschule Veddel  1928–29
 Heringskühlhaus Grasbrookhafen 1928–29
 Entwurf Flughafengebäude Lübeck-Travemünde 1928–30
 Krematorium Ohlsdorf  1928–29
 Bedürfnisanstalt Billhorner Kanal 1929
 Bedürfnisanstalt und Beratungsstelle 1929
 Bedürfnisanstalt Süderstraße  1929
 Bedürfnisanstalt Osterbekstraße  1929
 Wohlfahrtsstelle II auf St. Pauli  1929
 Lyzeum Cuxhaven 1929
 Volksschule Hamm-Marsch 1929
 Bürogebäude für die Stadtreinigung 1929
 Mannschaftsgebäude für die Stadtreinigung 1929
 Entwurf für die Feuerwache Wandsbek  1929
 Schleidenbrücke 1929
 Studie zum Bebauungsplan Habichtplatz 1916 (29)
 Bebauungsplan Zoologischer Garten  um 1929
 Volksschule Langenhorn  1929–30
 Volksschule Schaudinnsweg 1928–29
 Luisenschule Bergedorf  1929–30
 Volksschule Berne  1929–30
 Binderstraße 1929–30
 Volksschule Bauersberg  1929–30
 Polizeiwache Harzlohplatz 1929–30
 Volksschule Bogenstraße  1929–31
 Oberrealsschule für Mädchen Hamm  1929–31
 Altersheim Groß-Borstel  1929–31
 Volksschule Tiroler Straße 1930
 Bedürfnisanstalt Heubergredder 1930
 Feuerwache Rugenberger Hafen 1930
 Kaischuppen 59 1930
 Wiesendammbrücke 1927–28
 Bedürfnisanstalt und Warteraum Wilhelmsburger Platz 1931
 Polizeiwache Geesthacht 1931
 Volksschule Graudenzer Weg  1931–32
 Bedürfnisanstalt Winterhuder Marktplatz 1933
 Verlegung des Kaiser-Friedrich-Wilhelm-Denkmals 1933
 Bühnenbildentwürfe  um 1933
 Grabmal Schumacher  1941
 Volksschule Rungestraße 1931
 Direktorenwohnhaus im Institut für Geburtenhilfe 1926–27
 Heimatkunde-Museum Bergedorf  1919–20
 Wohnhäuser Fuhlsbüttel  1920
 Höhere Mädchenschule Curschmannstraße um 1916
 Bebauungsplanung Wohldorf-Ohlstedt 1911
 Polizeiwache Rabenstraße  1926 (entfällt, vergl. W 332)
 Friedhofskapelle Finkenwerder 1926 –27
 Toranlagen Friedhof Finkenwerder 1927
 Bedürfnisanstalt Ohlsdorfer Friedhof 1927
 Bezirksdepot der Straßenreinigung 1928
 Wohnhaus auf dem Materialplatz Ohlsdorfer Friedhof  1920
 Jugendstrafanstalt Hahnöfersand  1926–29
 Pavillonschule Langenhorn  1919–20
 Erweiterung der Blumenmarkthalle 1926
 Erziehungsheim Wulfsdorf 1927–30
 Polizeiwache Alte Rabenstraße  1926
 Stadtgärtnerei Alsterdorferchaussee 1929
 Hörsaal der Säuglingsabteilung Eppendorfer Krankenhaus 1919
 Säuglingsabteilung Eppendorfer Krankenhaus 1919
 Erweiterungsbau für das Beleuchtungswesen  ca. 1927
 Erweiterung des Botanischen Staatsinstituts 1913
 Planetarium im ehemaligen Wasserturm  1927–28
 Entwurf zum Neubau eines Planetariums 1925–27
 Umbau des Karstadt-Verwaltungsgebäudes 1927
 Müllverwertungsanlage Köln  1923
 Anbau Verwaltungsflügel Museum für Völkerkunde 1928
 Anbauten Hafenkrankenhaus 1925
 Erweiterung des Physikalischen Staatslabors 1913
 Pavillons auf dem Hamburger Rathausmarkt 1929–30
 Gestaltung der Deutschen Kriegsausstellung 1916
 Entwurf eines Ernst-Merck-Denkmal  um 1916
 Beamtenwohnhäuser Glasmoor  1928
 Achsenmodell - Stadtentwicklungsplanungen für Hamburg um 1919
 Dritte Irrenanstalt Groß-Hansdorf 1915
 Kapelle in Worms  ohne Datum
 Erweiterung der Anstalt für schulentlassene Mädchen 1913–14
 Erweiterung des Vorlesungsgebäudes  Krankenhaus Eppendorf 1920
 Erweiterung der höheren Staatsschule in Cuxhaven 1929
 Blumenstraßenbrücke 1919
 Skagerrakbrücke 1919

References

Schumacher